Kristopher Hugh Martin Schau (born 12 August 1970) is a Norwegian musician, TV host, comedian, author, and songwriter. He was born in Oslo.

Radio and television shows
Schau is known from several radio shows (most of them also with his brother Alexander Schau) including XL, Karate, and Et Norge I Krig. On TV he has been involved in the shows XLTV, Team Antonsen (2004), and De 7 dødssyndene (2007). He has also been part of several bands, among them Gartnerlosjen, Hurra Torpedo, Kåper Gjete, Sinsen, Reidar Roses Orkester, Datsun, The Cumshots, Mongo Ninja and The Dogs. He is also the writer of the Norwegian underground comic Margarin which is now discontinued. He has created the television shows Dag and One Night with his friend Øystein Karlsen.

De 7 dødssyndene
In 2007, Schau launched his television show, De 7 dødssyndene, focusing on the seven deadly sins. In the show, Schau attempted to commit all the deadly sins, combined with Schau and his co-hosts, Øystein Karlsen and Morten Ståle Nilsen, presenting information on the history of sin and related subjects. Many Norwegian conservative Christians protested against the program. They organized a petition and a boycott against the show's corporate sponsors, leading to several companies dropping their advertisements. This did not decrease the show's popularity.

"Forfall"
One of his projects had him living in a brown Opel Rekord automobile for a whole week. This event was also televised in daily segments. Another one of his projects was "Forfall" (en. decline), where Schau devoted an entire week to living as unhealthily as possible. Originally the idea was to deteriorate both physically and mentally, but despite the initial intentions in the mental area (reading books by Norwegian pulp fiction authors), the project mainly focused on eating unhealthy foods and smoking. He spent the entire week on display in an Oslo shop window. The project was also shown on TV and streamed on the internet for the entire week. He gained about 10 kg (22 lbs) and his cholesterol level skyrocketed during the project. He also nearly suffered a heatstroke when the temperature in the shop window display was significantly increased. The heat experiment was then aborted.

Court case
During the 2004 Quartfestival, a couple, who were both members of Fuck for Forest, had sex on stage during a concert with The Cumshots, a band fronted by Schau. This led to a lawsuit against Schau, the other band members and the couple who performed the sex stunt. Schau and his bandmate Ole Petter Andreassen were both fined 10 000 NOK for their roles in the stunt.

References

External links 
 

1970 births
Living people
Norwegian male comedians
Norwegian stand-up comedians
Norwegian rock singers
Norwegian radio personalities
Norwegian television personalities
Norwegian heavy metal singers
Norwegian multi-instrumentalists
21st-century Norwegian singers